The various authors of the Hebrew Bible (Tanakh, or Old Testament) have provided various names.

Isaiah 14:12 is about one Helel ben Shahar, called the King of Babylon in the text. Helel ("morning star, son of the dawn") is translated as Lucifer in the Vulgate Bible but its meaning is uncertain.

Saturn is no less certainly represented by the star Kaiwan (or Chiun), worshipped by the Israelites in the desert (Amos 5:26). The same word (interpreted to mean "steadfast") frequently designates, in the Babylonian inscriptions, the slowest-moving planet; while Sakkuth, the divinity associated with the star by the prophet, is an alternative appellation for Ninurta, who, as a Babylonian planet-god, was merged with Saturn. The ancient Syrians and Arabs, too, called Saturn Kaiwan, the corresponding terms in the Zoroastrian Bundahish being Kevan. The other planets are individualized in the Bible only by implication. The worship of gods connected with them is denounced, but without any manifest intention of referring to the heavenly bodies. Thus, Gad and Meni (Isaiah 65:11) are, no doubt, the "greater and the lesser Fortune" typified throughout the East by Jupiter and Venus; Neba, the tutelary deity of Borsippa (Isaiah 46:1), shone in the sky as Mercury, and Nergal, transplanted from Assyria to Kutha, as Mars.

Constellations 
The subjoined list gives (largely on Schiaparelli's authority) the best-warranted interpretations of biblical star names:
 Kimah, the Pleiades
 Kesil, Orion
 Ash, or Ayish, the Hyades
 Mezarim, the Bears (Great and Little)
 Mazzaroth, Venus (Lucifer and Hesperus)
 Hadre theman -- "the chambers of the south" -- Canopus, the Southern Cross, and α Centauri
 Nachash, Draco

Kimah and Kesil 
The Bible names some half-dozen star groups, but authorities differ widely as to their identity. In a striking passage, the Prophet Amos glorifies the Creator as "Him that made Kimah and Kesil", rendered in the Vulgate as Arcturus and Orion. Now Kimah certainly does not mean Arcturus. The word, which occurs twice in the Book of Job, is treated in the Septuagint version as equivalent to the Pleiades. This, also, is the meaning given to it in the Talmud (TB Brachot 58b) and throughout Syrian literature; it is supported by etymological evidences, the Hebrew term being obviously related to the Arabic root kum (accumulate), and the Assyrian kamu (to bind); while the "chains of Kimah", referred to in the sacred text, not inaptly figure the coercive power imparting unity to a multiple object. The associated constellation Kesil is doubtless no other than Orion. Yet, in the first of the passages in Job where it figures, the Septuagint gives Herper; in the second, the Vulgate quite irrelevantly inserts Arcturus; Carsten Niebuhr (1733–1815) understood Kesil to mean Sirius; Thomas Hyde (1636–1703) held that it indicated Canopus. Now kesil signifies in Hebrew "impious", adjectives expressive of the stupid criminality which belongs to the legendary character of giants; and the stars of Orion irresistibly suggest a huge figure striding across the sky. The Arabs accordingly named the constellation Al-gebbar, "the giant", the Syriac equivalent being Gabbara in old Syriac version of the Bible known as Peshitta. We may then safely admit that Kimah and Kesil did actually designate the Pleiades and Orion. But further interpretations are considerably more obscure. The Jewish Biblical Commentator Rashi says that Kimah emits cold, and that is what makes winter so cold. However, Kesil emits heat preventing the winter from getting too cold.

Ash 
In the Book of Job—the most distinctively astronomical part of the Bible—mention is made, with other stars, of Ash and Ayish, almost certainly divergent forms of the same word. lts signification remains an enigma. The Vulgate and Septuagint inconsistently render it "Arcturus and Hesperus". Abenezra (1092–1167), however, the learned Rabbi of Toledo, gave such strong reasons for Ash, or Ayish, to mean the Great Bear, that the opinion, though probably erroneous, is still prevalent.
It was chiefly grounded on the resemblance between ash and the Arabic na 'ash, "a bier", applied to the four stars of the Wain, the three in front figuring as mourners, under the title of Benât na 'ash, "daughters of the bier". But Job, too, speaks of the "children of Ayish", and the inference seems irresistible that the same star-group was similarly referred to in both cases. Yet there is large room for doubt.
The Jewish Biblical Commentator Rashi says that Ayish is Alcyone. "Its Children" are the other stars of the Pleiades. Ayish needs to be consoled because two of the stars of The Pleiades were moved to Aries at the Deluge .

Modern philologists do not admit the alleged connection of Ayish with na 'ash, nor is any funereal association apparent in Book of Job. On the other hand, Professor Schiaparelli draws attention to the fact that ash denotes "moth" in the Old Testament, and that the folded wings of the insect are closely imitated in their triangular shape by the doubly aligned stars of the Hyades. Now Ayish in the Peshitta is translated Iyutha, a constellation mentioned by St. Ephrem and other Syriac writers, and Schiaparelli's learned consideration of the various indications afforded by Arabic and Syriac literature makes it reasonably certain that Iyutha authentically signifies Aldebaran, the great red star in the head of the Bull, with its children, the rainy Hyades. It is true that Hyde, Ewald, other scholars have adopted Capella and the Kids as representative of Iyutha, and therefore of "Ayish and her children"; but the view involves many incongruities.

Hadre Theman (Chambers of the South)
The glories of the sky adverted to the Book of Job include a sidereal landscape vaguely described as "the chambers [i.e. penetralia] of the south". The phrase, according to Schiaparelli, refers to some assemblage of brilliant stars, rising 20 degrees at most above the southern horizon in Palestine about the year 750 B.C. (assumed as the date of the Patriarch Job), and, taking account of the changes due to precession, he points out the stellar pageant formed by the Ship, the Cross, and the Centaur meets the required conditions. Sirius, although at the date in question it culminated at an altitude of 41 degrees, may possibly have been thought of as belonging to the "chambers of the south"; otherwise, this splendid object would appear to be ignored in the Bible.

Mezarim
Job opposes to the "chambers of the south", as the source of cold, an asterism named Mezarim (37:9). Both the Vulgate and the Septuagint render this word by Arcturus, evidently in mistake (the blunder is not uncommon) for Arctos. The Great Bear circled in those days much more closely round the pole than it now does; its typical northern character survives in the Latin word septentrio (from septem triones, the seven stars of the Wain); and Schiaparelli concludes from the dual form of mezarim, that the Jews, like the Phoenicians, were acquainted with the Little, as well as with the Great, Bear. He identifies the word as the plural, or dual, of mizreh, "a winnowing-fan", an instrument figured by the seven stars of the Wain, quite as accurately as the Ladle of the Chinese or the Dipper of popular American parlance.

Mazzaroth

Perhaps the most baffling riddle in Biblical star nomenclature is that presented by the word Mazzaroth or Mazzaloth usually, though not unanimously admitted to be phonetic variants. As to their signification, opinions are hopelessly divergent. The authors of the Septuagint transcribed, without translating, the ambiguous expression; the Vulgate gives for its equivalent Lucifer in Job, the Signs of the Zodiac in the Book of Kings. St. John Chrysostom adopted the latter meaning, noting, however, that many of his contemporaries interpreted Mazzaroth as Sirius. But this idea soon lost vogue while the zodiacal explanation gained wide currency. It is, indeed, at first sight, extremely plausible. Long before the Exodus the Twelve Signs were established in Euphratean regions much as we know them now. Although never worshipped in a primary sense, they may well have been held sacred as the abode of deities. The Assyrian manzallu (sometimes written manzazu), "station", occurs in the Babylonian Creation tablets with the import "mansions of the gods"; and the word appears to be etymologically akin to Mazzaloth, which in rabbinical Hebrew signifies primarily the Signs of the Zodiac, secondarily the planets. The lunar Zodiac, too, suggests itself in this connection. The twenty-eight "mansions of the moon" (menazil al-kamar) were the leading feature of Arabic sky-lore, and they subserved astrological purposes among many Oriental peoples. They might, accordingly, have belonged to the apparatus of superstition used by the soothsayers who were extirpated in Judah, together with the worship of the Mazzaroth, by King Josiah, about 621 B.C. Yet no such explanation can be made to fit in with the form of expression met with in the Book of Job (38:32). Speaking in the person of the Almighty, the Patriarch asks, "Canst thou bring forth Mazzaroth in its time?"—clearly in allusion to a periodical phenomenon, such as the brilliant visibility of Lucifer, or Hesperus. Professor Schiaparelli then recurs to the Vulgate rendering of this passage. He recognizes in Mazzaroth the planet Venus in her double aspect of morning and evening star, pointing out that the luminary designated in the Book of Kings, with the sun and moon, and the "host of heaven" must evidently be next in brightness to the chief light-givers. Further, the sun, moon, and Venus constitute the great astronomical triad of Babylonia, the sculptured representations of which frequently include the "host of heaven" typified by a crowd of fantastic animal-divinities. And since the astral worship anathematized by the prophets of Israel was unquestionably of Euphratean origin, the designation of Mazzaroth as the third member of the Babylonian triad is a valuable link in the evidence. 

Protestant exegesis has tended to favor the Zodiac interpretation. The influential 19th century German Protestant Keil and Delitzsch Commentary understood the reference to Mazzaroth in the passage in Job thus: "The question in v. 32a therefore means: canst thou bring forth the appointed zodiacal sign for each month, so that (of course with the variation which is limited to about two moon's diameters by the daily progress of the sun through the Zodiac) it becomes visible after sunset and is visible before sunset?".

Nachash 
The Euphratean constellation Draco is of hoary antiquity, and would quite probably have been familiar to Job. On the other hand, Rahab, translated "whale" in the Septuagint, is probably of legendary or symbolical import.

See also 
 Biblical cosmology
 Hebrew astronomy

References

External links

Biblical cosmology